Peter W. Nordell (born August 30, 1966 in DuPage County, Illinois) is an American rower.

References 
 
 

1966 births
Living people
American male rowers
People from DuPage County, Illinois
Rowers at the 1988 Summer Olympics
Olympic bronze medalists for the United States in rowing
World Rowing Championships medalists for the United States
Medalists at the 1988 Summer Olympics